The 15th congressional district of Illinois is currently located in central Illinois. 
It was located in eastern and southeastern Illinois until 2022. It is currently represented by Republican Mary Miller.

With a Cook Partisan Voting Index rating of R+26, it is the most Republican district in Illinois. In most of the district, there are no elected Democrats above the county level, and Donald Trump carried over 70% of the district's vote in both of his bids for president.

Geographic boundaries

2011 redistricting
The congressional district covers parts of Bond, Champaign, Ford and Madison counties, and all of Clark, Clay, Clinton, Coles, Crawford, Cumberland, Douglas, Edgar, Edwards, Effingham, Fayette, Gallatin, Hamilton, Hardin, Jasper, Johnson, Lawrence, Madison, Marion, Massac, Moultrie, Pope, Richland, Saline, Shelby, Vermilion, Wabash, Washington, Wayne, and White counties. All or parts of Centralia, Charleston, Danville, Edwardsville, Effingham, Glen Carbon, Mattoon, and Rantoul will be included. The representatives for these districts were elected in the 2012 primary and general elections, and the boundaries became effective on January 5, 2013.

2021 redistricting

As of the 2020 redistricting, this district will shift from covering southeastern Illinois to encompassing the majority of Central Illinois. The district takes in Calhoun, Jersey, Greene, Pike, Scott, Morgan, Cass, Brown, Adams, Schuyler, Menard, Mason, Hancock, Henderson, Logan, DeWitt, Edgar, Douglas, Moultrie, Shelby, Christian, Montgomery, Fayette, and Bond Counties; most of Madison, Macon, Champaign, and Warren Counties; half of Sangamon, Piatt, and Coles Counties; and part of Vermillion County.

Madison County is split between this district and the 13th district. They are partitioned on the western side by Summer St, Belleview Ave, State St, Bluff St, W 9th St, Illinois Highway 111, US Highway 67, Humbert Rd, Northwest Dr, Seminary Rd, Harris Ln, Wood Station Rd, Torch Club Rd, and Seller Rd, West Fork Wood River. They are partitioned on the eastern side by West County Line Rd, Main St, County Line Rd, Voorhees Ln, Cahokia Creek, Old Carpenter Rd, Illinois Highway 143, McCoy Dr, Alexander Dr, Dunlap Lake, Old Troy Rd, Illinois State Rte 159, Vandalia St, Union Ave, Portland St, Lebanon Rd, E Main St, and Illinois Highway 159. The 15th district takes in the municipalities of Highland, and part of Collinsville.

Macon County is split between this district and the 13th district. They are partitioned on the northern side by Wise Rd. They are partitioned on the southern side by Sangamon River, Lincoln Memorial Parkway, Pebble Springs Rd, River Dr, W Hill Rd, S Twin Lakes Rd, US Highway 36, Illinois Highway 72, Bloomington Rd, W Mound Rd, Greenridge Dr, Illinois Highway 121, W Pershing Rd, Summit Ave, W Ravina Park Rd, Home Park Rd, N Westlawn Ave, W Marietta St, N Taylor Ave, N Fairview Ave, W Lincoln Park Dr, Illinois Highway 105, S Maffit St, E Riverside Ave, S Jasper St, E Lake Shore Dr, Lake Decatur, Norfolk Southern Railroad, Norfolk Ave, N 70th St, and William St Rd/Norfolk Rd. The 15th district takes in the municipalities of Macon, Maroa, Mount Zion, and Long Creek; and the southern and western outer portions of Decatur.

Champaign County is split between this district, the 2nd district, and the 13th district. The 15th and 2nd districts are partitioned by County Road 3000 N, County Road 1200 E, County Road 2800 N, County Road 1500 E, Liberty Ave, E Chandler St, County Road 1800 E, and County Road 2800 N, and County Road 2000 E. The 15th and 13th districts are partitioned by County Road 300 E, County Road 600 N, County Road 600 E, County Road 900 N, County Road 1200 E, W Old Church Rd, Deers Rd, County Road 1800 E, Airport Rd, US Highway 45, E Olympian Rd, N Willow Rd, E Ford Harris Rd, County Road 2000 N, N Duncan Rd, W Bloomington Rd, N Staley Rd, W Cardinal Rd, and County Road 1800 N. The 15th district takes in the municipalities of Mahomet, St. Joseph, Tolono, Thomasboro, and Homer.

Warren County is split between this district and the 17th district. They are partitioned by 60th St and 180th Ave. The 15th district takes in the municipalities of Little York, Kirkwood, and Roseville.

Sangamon County is split between this district and the 13th district. They are partitioned by Lead Line Rd, Mansion Rd, N Main St, US Highway 72, Cockrell Ln, Hollis Dr, S Koke Mill Rd, Sangamon Valley Trail, Tozer Rd, Central Point Rd, Illinois Highway 29, North 1st St, East Sangamon Ave, US Highway I-55, South Grand Ave East, East Cook Rd, East Walnut Rd, Clear Lake Rd, Pfeiffer Rd, Barclay Rd, W Thompson Rd, and N Carpenter Rd. The 15th district takes in the municipalities of New Berlin, Sherman, Williamsville, and Riverton; and part of Springfield.

Piatt County is split between this district and the 13th district. They are partitioned on the northern side by E County Road 1800 N. They are partitioned on the southern side by E County Road 400 N and E County Road 600 N. The 15th district takes in the municipalities of Mansfield and De Land.

Fulton County is split between this district and the 17th district. They are partitioned by East Oscar Linn Highway. The 15th district takes in the municipalities of Astoria and Lewistown.

McDonough County is split between this district and the 17th district. They are partitioned by US Highway 136, US Highway 67, N 1150th Rd, Grant St, Deer Rd, N 1200th St, S Quail Walk Rd, Jamestown Rd, Arlington Rd, La Moine River, Emory Rd, N 1400th Rd, Krohe Dr, E 1200th St, N 1800th Rd, and E 1900th St, N 1700th St, E 2000th St. The 15th district takes in the municipalities of Colchester and Bushnell.

Mercer County is split between this district and the 15th district. They are partitioned by 220th St. The 15th district takes in the municipalities of Aledo, Keithsburg, and New Boston.

Coles County is split between this district and the 12th district. They are partitioned by West St, North County Rd 1800 East, Lincoln Prairie Grass Trail, 18th St, County Rd 1600 East, County Rd 400 North, County Rd 1240 East, Illinois Route 16, Dettro Dr, 700 North Rd, Old Fellow Rd, and the Kickapoo Creek. The 15th district takes in the municipalities of Mattoon, Charleston, and Humboldt.

Vermillion County is split between this district and the 2nd district. They are partitioned by Twin Hills Rd, 1730 East, 1295 North, 1700 East, 1200 North, 1670 Rd East, 1050 North, Highway 150, Westville Ln, 1100 North, 800 East, 1200 North, and Lincoln Trail Rd. The 15th district takes in the municipalities of Georgetown, Indianola, and Ridge Farm.

Recent statewide election results

Recent election results

2012

The district covered much of the territory previously in the 19th district, and its incumbent, Republican John Shimkus, filed to run in the redrawn 15th. Angela Michael, a retired nurse and anti-abortion activist, ran on a single-issue anti-abortion Democratic ticket.

2014

2016

Shimkus faced no opposition in the general election, after facing a challenge in the Republican primary from Illinois State Senator Kyle McCarter, who had Tea Party backing and funding from the Club for Growth.

2018

Shimkus loomed large in the 15th, but finally faced credible (if not well-funded) Democratic opposition from a local teacher and former Obama campaign worker.

2020

After John Shimkus announced that he would not seek reelection, Republican nominee Mary Miller and Democratic nominee Erika Weaver emerged as contenders for the open Congressional seat.

2022

List of members representing the district

Historical district boundaries
From 2003-2013, the district included the cities of Charleston, Urbana, Danville, and Champaign, and all or parts of Livingston, Iroquois, Ford, McLean, DeWitt, Champaign, Vermillion, Macon, Piatt, Douglas, Edgar, Moultrie, Coles, Cumberland, Clark, Crawford, Lawrence, Wabash, Edwards, White, Saline, and Gallatin counties.

See also
Illinois's congressional districts
List of United States congressional districts

References

 Congressional Biographical Directory of the United States 1774–present

External links
2002 Census of Agriculture - 15th Congressional District Profile
District map
Congressional district profiles
Washington Post page on the 15th District of Illinois
U.S. Census Bureau - 15th District Fact Sheet

15
Champaign County, Illinois
Clark County, Illinois
Coles County, Illinois
Crawford County, Illinois
Cumberland County, Illinois
DeWitt County, Illinois
Douglas County, Illinois
Edgar County, Illinois
Edwards County, Illinois
Ford County, Illinois
Gallatin County, Illinois
Iroquois County, Illinois
Lawrence County, Illinois
Livingston County, Illinois
Macon County, Illinois
McLean County, Illinois
Moultrie County, Illinois
Piatt County, Illinois
Saline County, Illinois
Vermilion County, Illinois
Wabash County, Illinois
White County, Illinois
Constituencies established in 1873
1873 establishments in Illinois